The 2023 CrossFit Games is the 17th edition of the premier competition in the sport of CrossFit, scheduled to be held from August 3 to August 6, 2023, in Madison, Wisconsin.

The qualification process for the 2023 CrossFit Games was adjusted this season, and a worldwide ranking of athletes was introduced for the determination additional qualifying spots for the CrossFit Games. All the workouts for the semifinals will also be standardized.

The 2022 women champion Tia-Clair Toomey will not be defending her title due to pregnancy.

Qualifications
There are three qualification stages as before, but the number of competition regions has been reduced from 10 to seven: North American East, North American West, Europe, Africa, Asia, Australia and South America. Athletes are required to compete in their respective competition regions, but special exemptions are awarded to some athletes who applied for them. A new world ranking system was introduced, and athletes can acquire points across all four stages of the competition: the CrossFit Open, Quarterfinals, Semifinals, and Games over a two-year period. The ranking will be used to determine the strength of field of the semifinals and additional qualification places for the Games will be awarded based on the strength of field of the semifinals.

Open 
The Open began on February 16, 2023, with a live announcement in Madrid, Spain. It lasted three weeks until March 6 and had four scored workouts, with the 23.2 test split into two. This year the figure for Open participation increased by around 10% again, to 323,014.  The Open was won by Mal O'Brien and Jeff Adler.

Quarterfinals
As with 2022 season, the top 10% of the Open participants and top 25% of team in each continent qualify for the Quarterfinals. The top 60 women, top 60 men and the top 40 teams in the North American East, North American West and European regions will proceed to the semifinals. For the Africa, Asia, Australia and South America regions, the top 30 women and men, and the top 20 teams, will compete in their respective semifinals.

The Quartfinals started on 16 March 2023 with all five individual workouts released, to be completed and the results submitted by participating athletes on specified time periods until 19 March. The team  Quarterfinals will follow from March 29 through March 30, and age group from March 31 through April 1.

Semifinals
The number of competitions has been reduced from 10 to 7, with the number in North America and Europe reduced to two and one respectively, while the continents of Africa, Asia, Australia and South America would have one each as before. CrossFit itself will run the three competitions in North America and Europe. All the workouts for the semifinals will also be standardized, a return to the system used for the Regionals. There will be no Last Chance Qualifiers, instead a world ranking system system was introduced, and the number of qualifying places will be allocated based on the strength of the field in each of the semifinals as determined by the ranking system. Five qualification places are guaranteed for each of the North American and European competitions, three for Oceania, two each for Asia and South America, and Africa one. Of the 17 remaining qualifications spots, the D'Hondt method will be used to determine the number of qualifiers of each region based on the top 100 ranking of their participants.

References

External links 
 CrossFit Games official website

2023 in sports in Wisconsin
CrossFit
CrossFit Games
CrossFit Games
CrossFit Games